Richard "Pee Wee" Kirkland (born May 6, 1945) is a former American streetball player and drug kingpin.

Career

Basketball
Born in Manhattan, New York, Kirkland played varsity basketball at Charles Evans Hughes High School in Manhattan, New York, and was made an All-City guard. He was awarded a scholarship and attended Kittrell College, a community college in North Carolina, and was on the basketball team averaging 41 points per game. He then attended Norfolk State University and played on the basketball team, teaming up with future NBA star Bob Dandridge. The Spartans won the CIAA title in 1968 with a 25–2 record; they lost in the second round of the NCAA Division II Men's Tournament. The next year their record was 21–4 and they lost in the first round of the D-II tournament. In 1969 he was drafted by the Chicago Bulls with the fourth pick in the thirteenth round.  It is speculated that he turned the offer down because he was making more money in current ventures, including being a drug dealer, than he would in professional basketball. At the time, the opportunities offered to him outside of the NBA were far more lucrative, in terms of financial gain and public recognition. Kirkland was imprisoned for committing crimes, first in 1971 in Lewisburg, Pennsylvania. 

He also played in prison from 1981 to 1988 at Federal Correctional Institution, La Tuna in Texas. In the Anthracite Basketball League of central Pennsylvania he scored 100 and 135 points in two different games.

Motivational speaker
Kirkland travels the country speaking to youth about decision-making and pathways to success, in addition to self-esteem and other various issues plaguing the inner-cities of America.

He presents his messages in the "School of Skillz"—a basketball and life skills campaign that is co-sponsored by Nike. The camps began in the 1990s on Saturdays in Harlem and has since become a nationwide endeavor. He has won championships as a high school coach at The Dwight School, a prestigious private school on the Upper West Side, in New York City. One of his early breakthroughs involved reaching out to youth such as Hanif "Camel" Warren. As an educator and social worker, Kirkland utilizes the respect he receives from young people because of his gangster past to reach at-risk youth and break down their misconceptions about "keepin' it real" on the streets.

Kirkland earned a master's degree in human services from Lincoln University.

Media
In the basketball film Above the Rim, Kirkland appeared as Georgetown recruiter Phil Redd. Kirkland was mentioned and appeared in the music video for the song "Grindin" by the rap group Clipse. He is also mentioned in Terror Squad's "Lean Back", "Always on Time" by Ja Rule, "Zoom" by Future, and "All Work" by Curren$y and Young Dolph. He also appears in the documentary Sneaker Stories, filmed in 2008. Most recently, he appeared in the documentary Doin' It in the Park filmed in 2012 about the New York outdoor courts and players who lived on them. He is also mentioned by South Memphis rapper Young Dolph as a featured artist in the song 'All Work' by well known rapper Curren$y where Dolph describes himself as a legend just as Pee Wee Kirkland.
Kirkland also makes an appearance as himself in the 2018 basketball comedy Uncle Drew.

References

1945 births
Living people
African-American basketball players
American drug traffickers
American men's basketball players
American motivational speakers
Basketball players from New York City
Chicago Bulls draft picks
Kittrell College alumni
Lincoln University (Pennsylvania) alumni
Norfolk State Spartans men's basketball players
Shooting guards
Sportspeople from Brooklyn
Street basketball players
21st-century African-American people
20th-century African-American sportspeople